Erateina is a genus of moths in the family Geometridae erected by Edward Doubleday in 1848.

Species
This genus contains 85 described species, including:

 Erateina amazonia
 Erateina artabates
 Erateina attali
 Erateina garrulata
 Erateina julia
 Erateina kuczynskii
 Erateina leptograta
 Erateina meduthina
 Erateina puellaastuta
 Erateina radiata
 Erateina rogersi
 Erateina siliquata
 Erateina staudingeri
 Erateina subjunctaria
 Erateina undulata
 Erateina zoraida

Description
Species of this genus have a more or less elongated, caudate hindwings and a peculiar wing shape, characterized by the anal lobe of the males. They lack of a frenulum (in both sexes).

Habitat
These day-flying moths are typically montane and can be found in Neotropical cloud forests.

References

 ;  &  (2013). "A new Andean element in the lepidopterous fauna of the Guiana Shield: the day-flying genus Erateina Doubleday, with the description of two new species from Roraima, Tramen and Auyán Tepui (Geometridae: Larentiinae)". Genus. 24 (3-4): 291–301.
  (2011). "A morphological review of tribes in Larentiinae (Lepidoptera: Geometridae)". Zootaxa. 3136: 1–44.

Larentiinae
Geometridae of South America
Moths of South America